The long-tailed tapaculo (Scytalopus micropterus) is a species of bird in the family Rhinocryptidae. It is found in the eastern Andes of Colombia, Ecuador and far northern Peru.

Taxonomy and systematics

The long-tailed tapaculo was formerly considered a subspecies of rufous-vented tapaculo (Scytalopus femoralis) but was separated based principally on differences in their vocalizations. They are now classed as sister species.

Description

The long-tailed tapaculo is one of the larger species of genus Scytalopus, and, compared to other Scytalopus species, its tail is relatively long. Otherwise the long-tailed tapaculo has few distinctive morphological features: The male's plumage is drab, primarily dark gray with russet brown flanks that are barred with black. The female is similar but even drabber.

The long-tailed tapaculo's song typically begins with a series of single notes, but quickly turns into a series of couplets . Its alarm call is a descending series.

Distribution and habitat

The long-tailed tapaculo occurs along the east slopes of the Andes from Colombia south to northern Peru. There it inhabits humid shrubby areas along streams and forest edges.

Behavior

Feeding

Like other cloud forest tapaculos, the long-tailed tapaculo forages on or near the ground for small invertebrates.

Breeding

The long-tailed tapaculo probably breeds in all months. Birds collected in September and November had active gonads, but no other information has been published.

Status

The IUCN has assessed the long-tailed tapaculo as being of Least Concern. Though it has a somewhat restricted range and the population size is not known, both are believed large enough to allow that classification.

References

long-tailed tapaculo
Birds of the Colombian Andes
Birds of the Ecuadorian Andes
long-tailed tapaculo
long-tailed tapaculo
Taxonomy articles created by Polbot